Ramraje Naik is a senior leader of the Nationalist Congress Party. He was 13th Chairman of the Maharashtra Legislative Council 2015 to 2016 and 2016 to 7 July 2022.

His term in the Council was set to expire on 7 July 2016 but he was re-elected unopposed on 3 June.

References

Living people
Marathi politicians
Nationalist Congress Party politicians from Maharashtra
Members of the Maharashtra Legislative Council
Chairs of the Maharashtra Legislative Council
1948 births